The 2009 Vodacom Cup was the 12th edition of this annual domestic cup competition. The Vodacom Cup is played between provincial rugby union teams in South Africa from the Currie Cup Premier and First Divisions.

Competition
There were 14 teams participating in the 2009 Vodacom Cup competition. These teams were geographically divided into two sections - the Northern Section and the Southern Section, each with seven teams.  Teams would play all the teams in their section once over the course of the season, either at home or away.

Teams received four points for a win and two points for a draw. Bonus points were awarded to teams that score four or more tries in a game, as well as to teams losing a match by seven points or less. Teams were ranked by points, then points difference (points scored less points conceded).

The top four teams in each section qualified for the play-offs. In the quarter finals, the teams that finished first in each section had home advantage against the teams that finished fourth in the other section and the teams that finished second in each section had home advantage against the teams that finished third in the other section. The winners of these quarter finals then played each other in the semi-finals, with the higher placed team having home advantage. The two semi-final winners then met in the final.

Teams

Changes from 2008
The  were renamed .

Team Listing
The following teams took part in the 2009 Vodacom Cup competition:

Tables

Northern Section

Southern Section

Fixtures and results

Week One

 
! align=centre colspan=100| Bye
|- bgcolor="#FFFFFF"
| Vodacom Western Province
| Golden Lions

Week Two

 
! align=centre colspan=100| Bye
|- bgcolor="#FFFFFF"
| Border Bulldogs
| Vodacom Blue Bulls

Week Three

 
! align=centre colspan=100| Bye
|- bgcolor="#FFFFFF"
| Boland Kavaliers
| Griffons

Week Four

 
! align=centre colspan=100| Bye
|- bgcolor="#FFFFFF"
| SWD Eagles
| Griquas

Week Five

 
! align=centre colspan=100| Bye
|- bgcolor="#FFFFFF"
| Pumas
| Mighty Elephants

Week Six

 
! align=centre colspan=100| Bye
|- bgcolor="#FFFFFF"
| Vodacom FS Cheetahs
| Valke

Week Seven

 
! align=centre colspan=100| Bye
|- bgcolor="#FFFFFF"
| Platinum Leopards
|

Quarter finals

Semi finals

Final

Winners

Stats
 Top Point Scorers

 Top Try Scorers

 
 44 yellow cards were shown to 43 different players.

References

External links
 
 

Vodacom Cup
2009 in South African rugby union
2009 rugby union tournaments for clubs